Eric Lee McWilliams (born April 18, 1950) is a retired American professional basketball player born in Denver, Colorado.

A 6'8" forward from California State University, Long Beach, McWilliams played one season (1972–73) in the National Basketball Association as a member of the Houston Rockets. He averaged 2.0 points per game in 44 games. He played for the Stockholm, Sweden based Alviks BK during the 1975–76 season.

Notes

1950 births
Living people
American men's basketball players
Basketball players from Denver
Houston Rockets draft picks
Houston Rockets players
Long Beach State Beach men's basketball players
Pasadena City Lancers men's basketball players
Small forwards
Alviks BK players
American expatriate basketball people in Sweden